The following highways are numbered 552:

Canada
Alberta Highway 552
 Ontario Highway 552

India
 National Highway 552 (India)

United States